Second-hand Smoke is a compilation album by the band Sublime. It was released in 1997 following the death of lead singer Bradley Nowell the year before. Although this is technically a compilation album, it features some unreleased material as well as recycled and remixed versions of previous tracks. It is also regarded as their final album. Even though the surviving members of Sublime (Eric Wilson and Bud Gaugh) stated that the band would not make any more albums after Nowell's death, which would result in the band's breakup, MCA bound them by their contract and made the remaining members follow out their contract with the next 3 albums. Instead of recording more albums with Sublime, Wilson and Gaugh would record together in their later projects Long Beach Dub Allstars and Sublime with Rome.

Track listing

Songs
The song "Get Out!" originally appeared on their debut album 40 Oz. to Freedom but had to be removed when the album was picked up for distribution by MCA Records due to the presence of an unauthorized sample (which included bits of Jimmy Page's guitar and a looped section of John Paul Jones' bassline from "The Lemon Song"). The samples were all removed or replaced and the song was re-released as "Get Out! (remix)" (the original version of "Get Out!" complete with the samples can be found on Sublime's "Bums Lie" bootleg). "Thanx Dub" is a slightly longer instrumental version of the extended version of the song from the original cassette release of 40 Oz. to Freedom.

Two of the previously unreleased songs, "New Realization" and "Romeo" were recorded in 1988, very early in the band's career.

The song "Chick on My Tip" is perceived as an entirely English language version of "Chica Mi Tipo" from 40 Oz. to Freedom although the Spanish lyrics do not translate to the same content as in the English version. The title "Chica Mi Tipo" translates to the English "My Type of Girl". The Second-hand Smoke version of this song was recorded in 1989, along with the other unreleased tracks "Had a Dat" and "Slow Ride" (which also appeared on the band's 1991 demo tape Jah Won't Pay the Bills).

"Badfish" and "Saw Red" are the only songs to appear on this album virtually unchanged from their original LP versions, however both songs appear to have been remastered, if not remixed entirely. Some instrument sounds in "Saw Red", for example, come from the opposite stereo channel that they appeared on originally. Noteworthy of the song "Saw Red" is that Gwen Stefani sings a duet with Nowell; the song was originally released on the band's second album Robbin' the Hood in 1994, and this was before Stefani's band No Doubt hit mainstream success.

Charts

Weekly charts

Year-end charts

References

1997 compilation albums
Sublime (band) albums
MCA Records compilation albums
B-side compilation albums
Compilation albums published posthumously